Gustavo Zepeda Carranza (12 June 1923 – 29 October 2010) was a Mexican sport shooter. He competed in the trap event at the 1968 Summer Olympics.

References

1923 births
2010 deaths
Mexican male sport shooters
Olympic shooters of Mexico
Shooters at the 1968 Summer Olympics
Sportspeople from Mexico City